The 1971 Notre Dame Fighting Irish football team represented the University of Notre Dame during the 1971 NCAA University Division football season.

Prior to their concluding game at LSU, No. 7 Notre Dame  announced that they would not play in a bowl game

Schedule

Game summaries

Northwestern

Purdue

    
    

"The Genuflect Play"

Michigan State

Miami (Florida)

North Carolina

Southern Cal

Navy

Pittsburgh

Tulane

Louisiana State

Roster

Team players in the NFL

References

Notre Dame
Notre Dame Fighting Irish football seasons
Notre Dame Fighting Irish football